Sweet F.A. is the sixth studio album by English alternative rock band Love and Rockets, released in 1996 by American Recordings and Beggars Banquet.

Background 

Sweet F.A. mostly exchanged Hot Trip to Heaven's electronic sound for a harder rock sound, showcasing more conventional songwriting. Despite the presence of loud guitars common to the airwaves in the late 1990s ("Sweet Lover Hangover" was a minor alternative radio hit), the album follows the structure of a classic head album, growing more experimental and disjointed as it progresses, culminating in the aggressive electronic dance of "Here Come the Comedown" and the chaotic "Spiked".

The title refers to "Sweet Fuck-All," a modern variant of "Sweet Fanny Adams", which is common British naval slang for "nothing". "Fuck all else" is prominently sung by Daniel Ash throughout the title track.

"Natacha" was written for Natacha Atlas, a friend of the band who appeared on Ash's first solo album.

In April 1995, during the recording of Sweet F.A., a fire broke out in the house owned by American Recordings, where the band were living and recording. All of the members were uninjured, but their visiting friend Genesis P. Orridge of Psychic TV was injured escaping the fire. The band lost their gear (a photo of a burnt guitar was used for the album cover) and months of work on the album.

Track listing

Personnel 

 Daniel Ash – guitar, saxophone, and vocals
 David J – bass and vocals
 Kevin Haskins – drums and synthesizers

References 

1996 albums
Love and Rockets (band) albums
Albums produced by John Fryer (producer)